Juwan Green (born July 1, 1998) is an American football wide receiver for the Seattle Sea Dragons of the XFL. He played college football for the University at Albany, and was signed as an undrafted free agent by the Falcons on April 25, 2020. As a senior at the University at Albany, he broke team records for receptions, receiving yards, and touchdown receptions, as well as helped guide the team to their first playoff win.

He is the son of Dean Green, a former wide receiver at the University of Maryland.

Early life 
Green was born in Martinsburg, West Virginia and attended Martinsburg High School. Originally a basketball player, he made the switch to football during his senior year, where he played as both a wide receiver and cornerback. In addition to basketball, Green also participated in track and field. Green said he made the switch to football because he would be more likely to play the sport professionally.

College career 
Green played college football at Lackawanna College during his freshman and sophomore years before transferring to the University at Albany, where he graduated. During his time at Lackawanna, Green scored 11 touchdowns and also served as the team's kick returner. In his sophomore year, he caught 38 passes for 743 yards. He was also named team MVP. During his junior season, Green made 23 receptions for 429 yards and recorded four touchdowns. During his senior year at the University at Albany, he recorded 1,386 receiving yards and 17 touchdowns, both Colonial Athletic Association records.

Professional career

Pre-draft 
Green was not invited to the NFL Scouting Combine, but he did play in the NFLPA Collegiate Bowl. Although he was a starting wide receiver, he did not have any receptions during the game. Preceding the 2020 NFL Draft, Green was projected to be a late-round pick or priority free agent. He had been in contact with 15 NFL teams, but did not sign with any.

Atlanta Falcons 
Green was signed by the Atlanta Falcons as an undrafted free agent following the 2020 draft. He was waived before the season and signed to the practice squad, where he spent his entire rookie season. His practice squad contract with the team expired after the season on January 11, 2021. He re-signed with the Falcons with a one-year contract on May 6, 2021.

On August 31, 2021, Green was waived by the Falcons and re-signed to the practice squad the next day. He was released on September 15. He was re-signed to the team's practice squad on September 20.  He was released on November 5.

Detroit Lions
On December 28, 2021, Green was signed to the Detroit Lions practice squad. He was released on January 8, 2022.

Tennessee Titans
On June 1, 2022, Green signed with the Tennessee Titans. Green was released by the Titans on July 28, 2022.

Seattle Sea Dragons 
On November 17, 2022, Green was drafted by the Seattle Sea Dragons of the XFL.

Personal life 
Green has a major in communications. He is the son of Dean Green and Toni Stevenson. He has one sister, Ahry.

References

External links 
University at Albany biography
ESPN biography
Atlanta Falcons biography

1998 births
Living people
Sportspeople from Martinsburg, West Virginia
Players of American football from West Virginia
American football wide receivers
Lackawanna Falcons football players
Albany Great Danes football players
Atlanta Falcons players
Detroit Lions players
Tennessee Titans players
Seattle Sea Dragons players